That Model from Paris is a 1926 American silent comedy film directed by Louis J. Gasnier and starring Marceline Day, Bert Lytell, and Eileen Percy.

Synopsis
A shy young woman is persuaded to dress up and pretend to be a French model for a fashion show, leading to complications.

Cast

References

Bibliography
 Munden, Kenneth White. The American Film Institute Catalog of Motion Pictures Produced in the United States, Part 1. University of California Press, 1997.

External links

1926 films
Silent American comedy films
Films directed by Louis J. Gasnier
American silent feature films
1920s English-language films
Tiffany Pictures films
American black-and-white films
1926 comedy films
1920s American films